The Hongsibao Solar Park is a 50 MWp photovoltaic power station located in Ningxia Hui Autonomous Region, China. Most of it uses fixed tilt arrays, but a 2 MW tracker section was completed in 2011. The first stage, 20 MWp, was completed in 2010.

See also

List of photovoltaic power stations
Photovoltaic power station
Photovoltaics

References

Photovoltaic power stations in China
Buildings and structures in Ningxia